Miomantis paykullii is a species of praying mantis in the family Miomantidae.

It is one of several species sometimes known as the Egyptian praying mantis, along with Miomantis abyssinica.

The species is found in a number of African countries, including Egypt, Ivory Coast, Ghana, Uganda, Senegal and Togo, as well as Israel, in the Middle East.

It grows to an adult size of 3.5-4.5 cm.

See also
Mantodea of Africa
List of mantis genera and species

References

paykullii
Mantodea of Africa
Insects of Egypt
Insects of West Africa
Insects of Sudan
Insects of Uganda
Insects of the Middle East